Haro Bikes Corporation is an American BMX and Mountain bicycle manufacturer which was founded in 1978 by Bob Haro. The Haro bikes were considered Freestyle BMX bikes.

History

Haro Designs 
The company was founded in 1978 by Bob Haro, who began by producing number plates for BMX bikes in his home. Demand for the plates quickly outgrew his one-man capacity. Haro Designs, as the company was first named, was formed in 1980 with headquarters in Torrance, California.

As the company grew, Haro helped develop the sport of freestyle BMX. He travelled around the United States demonstrating radical trick-riding that had not been seen anywhere before. As a result, Haro earned the title "The Father of Freestyle."

During the early 1980s, the BMX boom continued. The company expanded its product line and established national and international distribution. During this time, the company was developing BMX and freestyle bikes and accessories. Haro Bikes' most popular BMX/Freestyle models were the Master and the Sport.

Haro 1983–1988: Unique Bike Innovation 
Haro introduced its first successful line of Freestyle BMX bikes in 1983. The Haro Sport and Master were the company's flagship bikes that sparked a revolution in bicycle design and imitation across the industry by other companies. In that year, its revenue greatly took off and it ignited a huge cult following.  In 1984, the company added the FST to its product line-up for consumers with lower budgets. As a result of Haro's huge success, companies like Hutch, Diamond Back, GT, Schwinn, Redline, Dyno, CW, and Skyway modeled their own frame versions after Haro's designs. During the 80s, GT became Haro's strongest competitor. However, because of Haro's huge profits from the Sport, GT's sales dwindled in comparison.

Haro possessed the best Freestyle team, dominating the 80s, 90s, and 2000s. It won the most first places and top honors more than any other bike team. It contracted the most popular Freestylers in the history of the sport: Mike Dominguez, Donovan Ritter, Marc McGlynn, Bryan Blyther, Dave Nourie, Matt Hoffman, Dennis Mccoy, Ron Wilkerson, Joe Johnson, Ryan Nyquist, Dave Mirra, Rick Moliterno, Bob Morales, Eddie Fiola, Rich Sigur, and R.L. Osborn, not to mention other significant riders.

During the 1980s GT struggled against Haro Bikes which dominated the freestyle BMX landscape and industry. As Haro was the most popular freestyle BMX bike at the time, it eclipsed GT in all categories especially in the number of bikes sold, number of sponsored freestyle riders and number of wins and trophies in competitions throughout the 80s and 90s.

Haro Bikes 
The first Haro bikes were manufactured by Torker. In 1982, when Haro introduced his own line of racing bikes, his sponsorship by Torker and Max was terminated.

Although injuries forced Haro to relinquish his riding duties, Haro Bikes subsequently compiled a virtual "who's who" list of talented riders including Bob Morales, Mike Dominguez, Dennis McCoy, Ron Wilkerson, Mat Hoffman, Donovan Ritter, Marc McGlynn, Brian Blyther, Dave Nourie, Mike King, Pete Loncarevich, Tony "The Tiger" Murray, and many more. These riders won nearly every title there was in both BMX and freestyle. Media attention quickly put Haro Bikes in the spotlight as an industry leader with a bicycle line focused on the high-end "Master" and more moderate "Sport". In 1986, Haro's design of the "Master" was at its climax with what is typically regarded as its most beautiful form with uniquely designed Haro Group 1 components, paint over chrome frame and forks, and uniquely designed flip-up pegs. The 1986 "Master" in team issue neon green with all original components has become highly collectible. In 1987, the "Master" was made over to reduce the cost of the 1986 model.

Company's sale 
In 1988, Bob Haro sold the company to a bigger bike company and agreed to a five-year consulting contract that provided continuing product innovation and a premium image for the brand. At the end of five years, Bob left Haro Bikes and started a graphic design company.

In 1993, the company was sold again, this time to a group of investors headed by Jim Ford, a Vice President at Haro Bikes since 1981. With its new independence, and with Jim leading the company as its President, the company re-established its focus on Bob Haro's original vision and began a rebuilding process that followed a sharp decline in the BMX market dating back to 1988.

Within one year, key management positions were filled and a new dealer base was established. A new competitive BMX racing team was formed and superstar freestyle riders Dave Mirra and Ryan Nyquist were signed by Haro soon after.

Before his death in 2016, Dave Mirra had left and made his own company Mirraco Bikes in 2007 (an enterprise of Trek Bicycle Corporation), ending his run with the Haro Brand.

As of 2019 Haro Bikes sponsors freestyle BMX riders Ryan Nyquist, Dennis Enarson, Chad Kerly, Matthias Dandois, Mike Gray and Dennis McCoy. They also sponsor BMX racers Nic Long and  Brooke Crain.

Products

2008 Bike Models 
Mountain bikes:
Ally SS, Ally XC, Beasley 1/9, Beasley SS, Calavera 27.5 Sport, Calavera 27.5 Comp, Escape, Escape Comp, Escape S, Escape Sport, Extreme X6, Extreme X6 Comp, Extreme X7, Flightline Comp, Flightline Expert, Flightline One, Flightline Sport, Flightline Two, Mary SS, Mary XC, Shift R1, Shift R3, Shift R5, Sonix, Sonix LT, Sonix S, Thread 1, Thread 8, Werx Sonix, Werx Xeon, Xeon, Xeon S

Hybrid bikes:
Maxwell, Roscoe, Sanford

Comfort Bikes:
Heartland, Heartland DLX, Heartland Express, Heartland Express LE, Heartland LTD

Cruiser bikes:
Railer SS, Railer SS Women's, Railer XS, Railer XS Women's, Zimzala Buster, Zimzala Cooper, Zimzala Maude, Zimzala Molly

BMX Bikes:
2009, 2009 24", F1, F16, F18, F1C, F2, F24, F3, F4, Forum Counterpart, Forum CPT Lite, Forum Intro, Forum Intro Lite, Forum Partial 16", Forum Partial 18", Forum Partial 20", Forum Pro, Forum Pro Lite, Group 1 SR 20, Group 1 SR 20 BLU, Group 1 SR 20XL, Group 1 SR Expert, Group 1 SR24, X0, X1, X2, X24, X3, Z-1, Revo 9

Kids bikes:
Flightline 20, Flightline 24, Group 1 SR Junior, Group 1 SR Micro, Group 1 SR Mini, Z-12, Z-16, Z-20

See also 
 List of BMX bicycle manufacturers

References

External links 
 Pictorial Timeline of the History of Haro Bikes

Cycle manufacturers of the United States
Mountain bike manufacturers
BMX